The history of lesbian, gay, bisexual and transgender people in Ireland.

Pre-20th century
The first recorded trans individual in Dublin was a 19th-century trans man Patrick McCormack, who lived from 1821 to 1871. McCormack was a famine survivor and worked as a labourer, while living in Castleknock. Another 19th-century trans man was Albert Cashier (born Jennie Hodgers, 1843–1915) from County Louth, who fought on the Union side of the American Civil War.

Writers and patriots
Ireland and Dublin, in particular, have always been regarded as the home of some of the greatest gay and lesbian writers in the English speaking world, some of whom are Oscar Wilde, Eva Selina Gore-Booth, Elizabeth Bowen, Kate O'Brien, Ladies of Llangollen, Somerville and Ross and Mary Dorcey

Legal situation

Prior to formal Irish independence in 1922, sexuality in Ireland was governed by the UK-wide laws emitted from the Parliament of the United Kingdom such as the Offences Against the Person Act 1861.  These laws were automatically inherited by the new Irish Free State.   The most notable legal event related to Irish natives was the trial and imprisonment of Oscar Wilde.  Some leaders of the Irish Independence struggle of the early 20th century were assumed - at the time or later - to be gay, notably Padraig Pearse and Roger Casement whose sexuality was an element in his trial and execution.

Post-independence
After independence, Ireland became a very insular society, dominated by the Catholic Church and was conservative, however in the midst of this, there was an acceptance of homosexuality of those within the acting profession such as Micheál MacLiammóir. It was widely accepted that Micheál MacLiammóir was gay and that his longtime life partner was Hilton Edwards. MacLíammóir would even appear on Irish TV in the 1950s and 1960s performing in drag. It is because of this that Irish people were never really surprised to see men dressing up as women on TV and even today, one of Dublin's drag queens, Shirley Temple Bar, presents bingo on prime-time national TV. MacLíammóir claimed when talking to Irish playwright Mary Manning to have had a homosexual relationship with General Eoin O'Duffy, former Garda Síochána commissioner and head of the quasi-fascist Blueshirts in Ireland, during the 1930s. The claim was revealed publicly by RTÉ in a documentary, The Odd Couple, broadcast in 1999. However, MacLíammóir's claims have not been substantiated by any evidence.

Economic development and civil unions

In the 1970s, the Campaign for Homosexual Law Reform was led by David Norris, who campaigned for then-current criminalization of homosexuality (namely those in force from 1861 and 1885) to be dismantled. In 1980, the case was taken before the Supreme Court of Ireland; losing the case, Norris took the case to the European Court of Human Rights, which ruled in 1988 against the Irish government. The laws were finally reformed in 1993 by then-Minister for Justice Máire Geoghegan-Quinn.

With the emergence of the Celtic Tiger economy from 1995 onwards, Ireland underwent a massive transformation both economically and socially. The individual wealth of the average Irish citizen quadrupled in the space of 15 years along with EU membership helped to liberalise and make this once conservative and religious society into one that is more open and pro-gay rights with a raft of pro-gay legislation. 73% of the Irish population support full gay marriage being extended to same-sex couples while 53% support the idea of same-sex adoption.

In 2011, civil partnership legislation was passed by the Dáil and Seanad and was enacted into law. Also, in 2011, Dominic Hannigan and John Lyons, both of the Labour Party, became the first openly gay TDs to be elected to the Dail, and Katherine Zappone became the first openly lesbian senator.

In 2015, Ireland became the first country in the world to legalise gay marriage through a referendum, with yes winning by over 62% of the vote. In a total over two million adults voted, and it was found that many younger adults participated in this vote to bring Ireland into a new era.

In 2017, Leo Varadkar was elected Taoiseach (Prime Minister), making him the youngest and first openly gay leader of Ireland.

See also

LGBT history
 Campaign for Homosexual Law Reform
 Oscar Wilde

References